Darick Hall (born July 25, 1995) is an American professional baseball first baseman and designated hitter in the Philadelphia Phillies organization.

Early life and amateur career
Hall grew up in Hereford, Arizona, and attended Buena High School.

Hall began his college baseball career at Cochise College as both a pitcher and a first baseman. He transferred to Dallas Baptist University after his sophomore year. In his only season with the Patriots, Hall was named the Missouri Valley Conference Player of the Year after he batted .302 and led the team with 20 home runs and 72 RBIs while also posting a 9–3 record as a pitcher. During the summer of 2014, Hall played for the Keene Swamp Bats of the New England Collegiate Baseball League.

Professional career

Hall was selected in the 14th round of the 2016 Major League Baseball draft by the Philadelphia Phillies. He was assigned to the short-season Williamsport Crosscutters after signing with the team. In 2017, Hall started the season with the Class A Lakewood BlueClaws and was named the South Atlantic League MVP after batting .272 with 28 doubles, 27 home runs, and 96 RBIs in 114 games. He was promoted to the Class A-Advanced Clearwater Threshers late in the season. Hall started the 2018 season with Clearwater and slashed .277/.367/.538 over 48 games before being promoted to the Double-A Reading Fightin Phils. He returned to Reading for the 2019 season and was named an Eastern League All-Star after he batted .235 with 20 home runs and 67 RBIs. Hall did not play in a game in 2020 due to the cancellation of the Minor League Baseball season because of the COVID-19 pandemic. He spent the 2021 season with the Triple-A Lehigh Valley IronPigs and hit for a .230 average with 41 extra-base hits and 60 RBIs. He returned to Lehigh Valley at the beginning of the 2022 season.

Hall was promoted to the Phillies' major league roster on June 29, 2022. He made his debut that night against the Atlanta Braves, going 0-4 as the Phillies' designated hitter in a 4–1 loss. The following day, Hall recorded his first two Major League hits on a pair of home runs, helping the Phillies to a 14–4 win over Atlanta. Hall hit his third hit, and his third home run on July 1, 2022 off St. Louis Cardinals pitcher Miles Mikolas in a 5-3 victory. He became one of 9 players in the expansion era to hit home runs for each of his first three hits. Hall slashed .250/.282/.522 with eight doubles and nine home runs in 41 games played during 2022.

Personal life
Hall's grandfather, James "Bo" Hall, played minor league baseball in the San Francisco Giants organization and was the head baseball coach at Cochise College and Eastern Arizona College. His uncle, Shane Hall, played three seasons in the Boston Red Sox organization.

References

External links

Dallas Baptist Patriots bio

1995 births
Living people
People from Cochise County, Arizona
Baseball players from Arizona
Major League Baseball first basemen
Philadelphia Phillies players
Dallas Baptist Patriots baseball players
Williamsport Crosscutters players
Lakewood BlueClaws players
Clearwater Threshers players
Reading Fightin Phils players
Lehigh Valley IronPigs players
Cañeros de Los Mochis players
Cochise Apaches baseball players
Scottsdale Scorpions players